Benedict Silberman, originally Boruch Hirsch-Benedigton Silberman (December 5, 1901 in Helsinki, Finland – December 11, 1971 in Hilversum, Netherlands), was a Dutch composer and conductor of Austrian Jewish descent.

Silberman was the son of an Austrian violinist working in Helsinki who settled in Amsterdam. He wrote a piano concerto (1924) at the end of his studies. A year later he composed a violin concerto.
He left for Berlin where he played as a violinist and arranged light classical musical, preferentially Viennese operettas. In 1944 he composed his own operetta Het Rozeneiland (The Island of Roses). He had contact with Franz Lehár, Robert Stolz and Emmerich Kálmán and toured Europe with the dance orchestras of Paul Godwin, Marek Weber and Dajos Bela.

In 1936 he returned to the Netherlands and became pianist in the AVRO radio orchestra of Kovacs Lajos.  In 1938 he became conductor of the VARA radio orchestra. In 1948 he was asked to create a radio orchestra specialized in light classical music; he led this  from 1949 till 1967. In 1965, he won the Golden Harp for his contributions to Dutch music.

In 1965 shlomo carlebach published the album in the palace of the king, Silberman arranged and conducted the chorus and symphony orchestra.

Benedict Silberman composed The battle of Waterloo, chambermusic which makes you relive the battle of Waterloo (Napoleon). Silberman was also the conductor of this music, the sound engineer was Ruud van Lieshout, the orchestra was the Promenade Orchestra, the producer was Gerrit den Braber and the recording supervisor was Joop Stokkermans.

The Battle of Waterloo is a fantasy by B. Silberman made after old motives.

References
 Robijns, Jozef; Zijlstra, Miep. Algemene muziek enciclopedie, De Haan, 1979–1984
 Ruppli, Michel. The Decca Labels. A Discography, Volume 6, Greenwood Press, 1996.

1901 births
1971 deaths
20th-century composers
Conservatorium van Amsterdam alumni
Dutch classical composers
Dutch classical pianists
Dutch conductors (music)
Male conductors (music)
Dutch Jews
Dutch people of Austrian descent
Jewish classical composers
Musicians from Amsterdam
20th-century conductors (music)
20th-century classical pianists
20th-century Dutch male musicians